Chadwick Township is an inactive township in Christian County, Missouri. It was named after a railroad official when the railroad came through in 1883.

References

Townships in Missouri
Townships in Christian County, Missouri